Nathania van Niekerk (born 22 January 1999) is a South African swimmer. She competed in the women's 200 metre backstroke at the 2019 World Aquatics Championships and she did not advance to the semi-finals.

References

External links
 

1999 births
Living people
Place of birth missing (living people)
Swimmers at the 2014 Summer Youth Olympics
South African female backstroke swimmers